Saint Grimonia (or Grimonie, Grimony, Germana) was a 4th-century Irish virgin who was martyred in La Capelle, Picardy, France.
The town is named after her chapel.
Her feast day is 7 September.

Life

Paul Guérin (1830–1908) published the account by Henri Congnet (1795–1870) of Soissons in his Les Petits Bollandistes vies des saints de l'Ancien et du Nouveau.
In summary, Grimonia was said to have been the daughter of a pagan chieftain in Ireland.
She converted to Christianity when she was aged about 12 and dedicated her life to Christ.
When she reached the age to marry, her father wanted her to wed one of the noblest and wealthiest chiefs in Ireland. 
She ran away, but was brought back and imprisoned.
She escaped through a miracle, took ship to France and landed on the coast of Gaul-Belgium where the Roman Emperor Valentinian I protected the Christians.
She settled deep in the forest of Thiérache in a place named Dorunum (now La Capelle), where she spent her days in prayer, meditation and penance.

Her father sent soldiers to find her and bring her back, alive or dead.
They followed her traces and eventually found her in the forest.
They tried to persuade her to return to her country where a lavish wedding awaited her.
Unable to convince her, they cut off her head and hid her mutilated body under a heap of dirt, then returned to Ireland.
After several years a chapel was erected over her grave, which became the nucleus of the town of La Capelle.
The relics were thought to have miraculous properties, and were moved several times in the years that followed, with different portions held in different places.

Monks of Ramsgate account

The monks of St Augustine's Abbey, Ramsgate wrote in their Book of Saints (1921),

Butler's account

The hagiographer Alban Butler (1710–1773) wrote in his Lives of the Fathers, Martyrs, and Other Principal Saints under September 7,

Notes

Sources

 

 

Female saints of medieval Ireland
Medieval Irish saints on the Continent
4th-century deaths